Robert Joseph Twyman (June 18, 1897 – June 28, 1976) was a U.S. Representative from Illinois.

Born in Indianapolis, Indiana, Twyman attended Georgetown University, Washington, D.C.
He was employed in foreign service by the Department of State.
During the First World War served as an ensign in the United States Navy.
He was employed by a public utility company in Guatemala in 1919.
Accepted a commission in the United States Navy in February 1941 and served until September 1945.
He was president of the Thomas Hoist Company, a supplier of construction and industrial lifts.

Twyman was elected as a Republican to the Eightieth Congress (January 3, 1947 – January 3, 1949).
He sponsored a bill that created a stamp honoring Swedish-Americans. For his efforts he was awarded a medal from the Swedish government in 1949.
He was an unsuccessful candidate for reelection in 1948 to the Eighty-first Congress.
He resumed business interests until retirement.
He died in West Palm Beach, Florida, June 28, 1976.
He was interred in Rosehill Cemetery in Chicago.

References

1897 births
1976 deaths
Burials at Rosehill Cemetery
Georgetown University alumni
United States Navy officers
Republican Party members of the United States House of Representatives from Illinois
20th-century American politicians